Janghemlung Panmei is an Indian politician. He was elected to the Manipur Legislative Assembly from Tamenglong in 2012 and 2022 Manipur Legislative Assembly election. He was earlier a member of Naga People's Front and Manipur State Congress Party.

References

Living people
Naga people
Manipur MLAs 2022–2027
National People's Party (India) politicians
1977 births
People from Tamenglong district
Social workers from Manipur